The Pakistan Journal of Botany (print: , online: , CODEN: PJBB6) is a bimonthly scientific journal published by the Pakistan Botanical Society.

Information
The journal was established in 1969 and publishes peer-reviewed full length research articles. Currently its contents are available from 2003 to date. However, on the completion of Digitalization Project, started in 2003 by Muhammad Ashraf, all issues will be available back to 1969. According to the Journal Citation Reports, its 2015 impact factor is 0.6h58.

External links
 
 Sceletium Tortuosum

Botany journals
Publications established in 1969
Bimonthly journals
English-language journals
Mass media in Pakistan